Sansaka Fernando (born 21 April 1995) is a Sri Lankan cricketer. He made his first-class debut for Panadura Sports Club in Tier B of the 2017–18 Premier League Tournament Tier on 21 December 2017.

References

External links
 

1995 births
Living people
Sri Lankan cricketers
Panadura Sports Club cricketers
People from Colombo